Sandrine Martinet (born 10 November 1982 in Montreuil, Seine-Saint-Denis), also known as Sandrine Aurières-Martinet, is a Paralympic judoka who won a gold medal for France at the 2016 Summer Paralympics. She had also won a silver medal for France at the 2008 Summer Paralympics. She had also won a silver four years earlier at the Athens Games.

References

External links
 
 

1982 births
Living people
French female judoka
Paralympic judoka of France
Paralympic silver medalists for France
Judoka at the 2004 Summer Paralympics
Judoka at the 2008 Summer Paralympics
Judoka at the 2020 Summer Paralympics
Medalists at the 2004 Summer Paralympics
Medalists at the 2008 Summer Paralympics
Medalists at the 2020 Summer Paralympics
Sportspeople from Montreuil, Seine-Saint-Denis
Paralympic medalists in judo
21st-century French women